Valentina Shaprunova (born 20 April 1937) is a Soviet athlete. She competed in the women's long jump at the 1956 Summer Olympics and the 1960 Summer Olympics.

References

1937 births
Living people
Athletes (track and field) at the 1956 Summer Olympics
Athletes (track and field) at the 1960 Summer Olympics
Soviet female long jumpers
Olympic athletes of the Soviet Union
Place of birth missing (living people)